a U.S. Army version of Canon d'Infanterie de 37 modèle 1916 TRP

See also
 M1915 (disambiguation)
 M1917 (disambiguation)